Cyrus Kingsbury (November 22, 1786 – June 27, 1870) was a Christian missionary active among the American Indians in the nineteenth century. He first worked with the Cherokee and founded Brainerd Mission near Chickamauga, Tennessee, later he served the Choctaw of Mississippi.  He  was known as "the Father of the Missions" in Indian Territory.

Early life
Kingsbury was born in Alstead, Cheshire County, New Hampshire on November 22, 1786. Almost nothing is known about his parents, who may have died when he was very young. Cyrus was raised in Worcester, Massachusetts by an aunt and uncle. In 1812, he graduated from Brown University with a bachelor's degree.  He then studied at Andover Theological Seminary, where he also graduated in 1815. Choosing to become a missionary to American Indians, he was hired as the first missionary by the American Board of Commissioners for Foreign Missions (ABCFM).

Starting a career as missionary
Kingsbury was ordained by the Congregational Church in Ipswich, Massachusetts in 1815. He was first sent to Tennessee in 1817, where he began ministering to the Cherokee tribe and founded Brainerd Mission near Chickamauga. According to A. C. Varnum, Brainerd included not only the mission itself, but also a boarding school and an agricultural school.

Marriage and family
Sarah B. Varnum, born in Dracut, Massachusetts on January 16, 1784, was one of ten children of Parker and Dorcas (née Brown) Varnum. Her father would become an elder in the Pawtucket Congregational Church. It is not clear when and how she would meet Cyrus Kingsbury, but evidently the event occurred and a strong attraction ensued. By 1818, when Kingston was preparing to start building with the Choctaws in Mississippi, he had proposed to marry her. Although he wanted to return to New England for the wedding, the church would not allow him to leave his post in Mississippi for a long enough time. Sarah and Cyrus were determined not to wait, but decided to meet in New Orleans. Sarah made the long, arduous ocean voyage unaccompanied from her parental home, while Cyrus came from Tennessee on horseback. They were married in New Orleans on Christmas Eve, 1818. After the ceremony, Cyrus and Sarah made the  trip back to Brainerd on horseback, spending their nights camping out and cooking their food over open fires.

Ministry in Mississippi
In 1818, Kingsbury was sent to Mississippi by the American Board of Commissioners for Foreign Missions and assigned to minister to the Choctaw Nation that lived there. His first activity was to establish Eliot Mission.

During childhood, Cyrus had injured a foot when he stepped on a scythe. The injury never healed properly, causing him to walk with a noticeable limp for the rest of his life. Soon after he took up residence in the Choctaw Nation, the tribe gave him a Choctaw name, NachobaAnowa, that meant"Limping Wolf" in English.

Mayhew Mission
In 1820, Kingsbury chose a location in the northeastern part of present-day Oktibbeha County, Mississippi that he deemed a suitable site for another mission. He described the location as, "... a point where the Ash Creek flows into the Tibbee Creek.” Cyrus named the site for the Mayhew family, another missionary family from Massachusetts. The Kingsburys, assisted by some other families and three unmarried women, started by building a boarding school, where they taught the Choctaws living around the mission to read, write, study the Bible and other subjects related to earning a living. The school opened on April 30, 1820, with twelve students who lived nearby. Enrollment increased soon to 18, with new students who came from elsewhere in the Choctaw Nation. A church building opened May 6, 1821, and became affiliated with the Tombigbee Presbytery of the Presbyterian Church.

Kingsbury's influence on the Choctaw Nation could be described as spectacular. For example, the Choctaw chiefs began to solicit his advice on how to deal with officials of the Federal Government. They specifically asked him to accompany their delegation to negotiate the 1820 Treaty of Doak's Stand. He did so, and was soon appalled at the U. S. commissioners negotiating tactics, calling the discussions, "Whiskey Negotiations." Kingsbury counseled the Choctaws to cease further negotiations until the commissioners stopped plying the Choctaws with liquor. The Choctaws did so, and the result was a more favorable outcome for the tribe.

Meanwhile, Sarah Kingsbury bore two children, Cyrus and John P. Sarah contracted an unidentified illness and died at the mission five days later, on September 15, 1822. Sarah was buried in the mission cemetery, and Cyrus and the boys lived at the mission for a few more years. When the boys were old enough to go to school, Cyrus sent them back East to be educated.  In 1824, Cyrus married Electa May. Well-suited to working as his partner as a missionary, she also saw to the raising of Cyrus' sons. Electa served with him until she died in July 1864.  Work continued on the mission, and by 1831, it included a gristmill, a blacksmith shop and a farm. In that year, the Choctaws at Mayhew Mission began their arduous trek to their new homeland in Indian Territory. Cyrus Kingsbury chose to accompany them all the way. 

Cyrus Kingsbury was one of four Mayhew missionaries credited with founding the First Presbyterian Church of Columbus, Mississippi in May, 1829. The other three were Thomas Archibald, Hilary Patrick and David Wright. Mayhew missionaries served the church until 1834. David Wright became the first permanent minister after the church built a sanctuary and obtained its charter in 1844.

Other Choctaw missions in Indian Territory

Kingsbury has been credited with building the church in the Choctaw town of Boggy Depot in 1840.

Civil War and the Choctaw Missions
As political unrest increased throughout the country, officials of the various missionary groups realized that Indian Territory could easily divide over the issue of slavery. Missionaries alerted their sponsors that the major tribes were already redefining their loyalties.

Honors
Kingsbury was awarded an honorary Doctor of Divinity (D.D.) degree by Brown University in 1854.

Death
Cyrus Kingsbury died June 27, 1870. He was the only missionary still residing in the Choctaw Nation at that time.  He was buried in the Boggy Depot cemetery, where his grave marker can still be seen.

Legacy
Cyrus Kingsbury's papers are in the Western History Collection at the University of Oklahoma library. A listing of the contents of the ten folders is available online.

Notes

References

External links 
  Varnum, A. C. "Sarah B. Varnum, Missionary to the Indians." pp. 117–122. In: History of Pawtucket Church & Society. Morning Mail Print. Lowell, Massachusetts. 1888.]

1786 births
1870 deaths
People from Alstead, New Hampshire
Brown University alumni
Andover Theological Seminary alumni
People of Indian Territory